"Lost & Not Found" is a song by British record production duo Chase & Status, featuring vocals from British singer Louis M^ttrs. It was released on 26 June 2013 as the lead single from their third studio album Brand New Machine. The song was originally due to be released on 30 June, but was included on Clubland 23 which was released on 24 June and the release date was brought forwards. Due to this incident, the song title was changed to include the "not" from the second half of the chorus.

Music video
A music video to accompany the release of "Lost & Not Found" was first released onto YouTube on 4 June 2013 at a total length of five minutes and eight seconds. As of April 2016, it has received over seven million views.

Critical reception
Lewis Corner of Digital Spy gave the song a positive review stating:

"It doesn't take a genius to figure out just how significant Chase & Status's contribution to electronic dance music has been. The duo – consisting of Saul Milton and Will Kennard – were instrumental in the rise of the dubstep-meets-pop movement following their contributions on Rihanna's 2009 album Rated R, while their last record boasted an all-star lineup and garnered critical and commercial success. It's a tack they are looking to continue with their new single 'Lost & Not Found', albeit with lighter breakbeats and bigger strings. "We're gonna take flight/ Paper planes getting rolled up/ Our dreams hit the fan/ The pain of getting older," vocalist Louis M^ttrs laments, before floating into a chorus more breezy than Brighton Pier. It might not be a total reinvention from the duo in an industry bursting with fresh EDM talent, but it's more than enough to keep them at the forefront of their game." .

Track listing

Credits and personnel
 Vocals – Louis M^ttrs
 Lyrics – Louis Collard-Watson (Louis M^ttrs)
 Producer – Chase & Status (Will Kennard and Saul Milton)
 Label – MTA Records, Mercury Records, RAM Records

Charts

Weekly charts

Year-end charts

Certifications

Release history

References

2013 songs
2013 singles
Chase & Status songs
Songs written by Will Kennard
Songs written by Saul Milton
Mercury Records singles
RAM Records singles
MTA Records singles